A laxometer is a measuring device for scalp skin mobility, used in hair restoration surgery, where a strip of skin from a donor area on the back of the scalp is transplanted.

History
The laxometer was first presented at the 15th Annual Meeting of the International Society of Hair Restoration Surgery in Las Vegas. It was invented by Parsa Mohebi, M.D. and introduced as the first tool that could objectively measure the laxity of scalp in hair transplant patients.  The second generation of Laxometer (Laxometer II was introduced in September 2011 in the scientific meeting of International Society of Hair Restoration Surgery.

Application
A laxometer determines the laxity or looseness of the scalp. This information reduces the risk of donor complications when a surgeon cannot easily close the donor wound after removing the strip of skin from the donor area. This is relevant for those patients who have a high demand for hair and scarce resources.

There are two types of laxometer:
 A clinical laxometer can be used during a clinic visit. Clinical laxometers are non-invasive and easy to use in assessing patients’ scalp laxity in pre-op evaluation or following the improvement of scalp laxity after a period of scalp exercise.
 An intra-operative laxometer is more precise and is used during hair transplant surgery right before removing the strip. Having a more precise measurement of scalp laxity can significantly reduce the chance of removing too much skin, which can make closure of the donor wound difficult.

References

Measuring instruments